Kondavalasa Lakshmana Rao (10 August 1946 – 2 November 2015), popularly known as Kondavalasa, was an Indian actor and comedian who worked in Telugu cinema and Telugu theatre.

Background
Kondavalasa Lakshmana Rao was born on 10 August 1946 in Srikakulam. He was an employee at Visakhapatnam Port Trust.

Before appearing in films, Kondavalasa was a stage actor, having given more than 1000 stage performances. Director Vamsy gave him an opportunity in his film Avunu Valliddaru Ista Paddaru. His famous dialogue Aithe okay (trsl. "Then it's okay") from the film Avunu Valliddaru Ista Paddaru increased his popularity. He went on to appear in over 65 Telugu films.

Death

Kondavala died on 2 November 2015. He was being treated at NIMS, Hyderabad following his illness.

It was reported that the comedian had been suffering from complications in the ear for the previous few days and the infection had spread to the brain, which led to his death.

Filmography

References

External links
 

1946 births
2015 deaths
Indian male film actors
Telugu male actors
Telugu comedians